Marcelo de Jesús Torres Cofiño (born 8 July 1966) is a Mexican politician and lawyer affiliated with the PAN. As of 2012 he served as Deputy of the LXII Legislature of the Mexican Congress representing Coahuila.

References

1966 births
Living people
Politicians from Torreón
20th-century Mexican lawyers
Members of the Chamber of Deputies (Mexico)
National Action Party (Mexico) politicians
21st-century Mexican politicians